The Infinity Race is a BBC Books original novel written by Simon Messingham and based on the long-running British science fiction television series Doctor Who. It features the Eighth Doctor, Fitz and Anji.

References

External links
The Cloister Library - The Infinity Race

2002 British novels
2002 science fiction novels
Eighth Doctor Adventures
Novels by Simon Messingham